Joseph Omer Fernand Perrault (March 31, 1927 – September 13, 2021) was a Canadian professional ice hockey player who played three games in the National Hockey League.  He played with the New York Rangers.

References

External links

1927 births
2021 deaths
French Quebecers
Canadian ice hockey left wingers
Ice hockey people from Quebec
New York Rangers players
New York Rovers players
People from Chambly, Quebec
Canadian expatriate ice hockey players in the United States